Anthony Ouasfane (born 29 May 1989) is a professional footballer who plays as a defender for Championnat National 2 club Toulon, where he is the captain. Born in France, he is a former Algeria youth international.

Club career
After playing for three different neighborhood clubs in Marseille, Ouasfane received offers from local side Marseille, and Toulouse. He chose Toulouse saying that "joining Marseille at such a young age scared [him] a little". With Toulouse, he became captain of the reserve side, even making a few appearances on the substitutes bench for the first team but failing to make any appearances.

On 16 May 2009, Ouasfane signed a three-year contract with Ligue 2 side Angers. On 21 August 2009, he made his professional debut, coming on as a substitute for Sébastien Renouard in the 60th minute of the Ligue 2 match against Le Havre.

On 17 July 2010, Ouasfane went on trial with English Championship side Crystal Palace. During his trial, he started in a pre-season friendly against Chelsea.

International career
On 9 August 2009, Algeria U23 national team's head coach Abdelhak Benchikha called up Ouasfane for the first time for a six-day training camp in Blida, Algeria. The camp was capped off with a friendly against local side USM Blida. He received further call-ups the following months for camps in Alger and Marseille.

References

External links

1989 births
Living people
Footballers from Marseille
Association football defenders
Algerian footballers
French sportspeople of Algerian descent
Algerian people of French descent
Angers SCO players
Toulouse FC players
Athlético Marseille players
SC Toulon players
Ligue 2 players
Championnat National players
Championnat National 2 players
Championnat National 3 players